Steven or Steve Baker is the name of:

Sportsmen
 Steve Baker (baseball) (born 1956), major league pitcher
 Steve Baker (footballer, born 1962), English footballer
 Steve Baker (footballer, born 1978), English footballer 
 Steve Baker (ice hockey) (born 1957), American ice hockey goaltender
 Steve Baker (motorcyclist) (born 1952), former Grand Prix motorcycle road racer
 Steve Baker (speedway rider), Australian motorcycle speedway rider
 Steven Baker (American football), American football player with the St. Louis Rams
 Steven Baker (Australian footballer) (born 1980), Australian rules footballer
 Steven Baker (figure skater), Croatian figure skater, winner of the Golden Bear of Zagreb

Others
 Steve Baker, designer of the Space Crusade boardgame
 Steve Baker (illusionist) (1938–2017), American comedian, magician and escape artist
 Steve Baker (politician) (born 1971), British Conservative Party MP for Wycombe
 Steven Baker (producer) (born 1976), Australian arranger, orchestrator and record producer

See also
 Stephen Baker (disambiguation)